The following lists events that happened during 1972 in the United Arab Emirates.

Incumbents
President: Zayed bin Sultan Al Nahyan 
Prime Minister: Maktoum bin Rashid Al Maktoum

Events

January
 January 24 - A month after bringing the Emirate of Sharjah into the United Arab Emirates, the emir, Khalid bin Mohammed Al Qasimi was assassinated in a coup attempt by the previous ruler, Saqr bin Sultan al-Qasimi, whom Khalid had overthrown in 1965. Saqr failed to regain the throne, and Sharjah has been ruled since then by Khalid's brother, Sultan bin Muhammad Al-Qasimi.

February
 February 10 - The seventh sheikhdom, Ras al-Khaimah, joins the United Arab Emirates.

March
 March 14 - Sterling Airways Flight 267, which was bringing Danish vacationers home from a holiday in Sri Lanka, crashed on its approach to the Dubai airport. All 112 people on board were killed.

References

 
Years of the 20th century in the United Arab Emirates
United Arab Emirates
United Arab Emirates
1970s in the United Arab Emirates